MSC Sindy is a container ship operated by the Mediterranean Shipping Company. She was built by Samsung Heavy Industries and sails under the flag of Panama.

Hull and engine
MSC Sindy is owned by Compania Naviera Sylvana and operated by Mediterranean Shipping Co. (MSC) It was built by the Samsung Heavy Industries Company and its yard number was 1611. MSC Sindy is the sister ship to the MSC Bruxelles.

MSC Sindy uses a 12-cylinder, two-stroke oil engine developing  and driving a single propeller. The ship has 4 auxiliary generators, each rated at 2,950 kW.

MSC Sindy can carry under 9,580 TEUs, 700 of which may be refrigerated containers. This means the ship can carry 9,580 twenty-foot containers. 

While being built, MSC Sindy went through 3 different names. Originally it was called MSC Sylvan. However, the summer before it was completed, it was changed to MSC Rosalba. Later that year it was again changed to MSC Sindy.

References

External links 
 Germanischer Lloyd online ship register
 Mediterranean Shipping Company fleet

Container ships
2007 ships
Ships built by Samsung Heavy Industries